The SD engine was replaced by the Nissan TD engine. It was manufactured by Minsei Diesel Industries, Ltd., which was renamed Nissan Diesel Motor Co., Ltd in 1960.

Straight-four

SD20

It had three main bearings. The Diesel versions of the Nissan Cedric in the 1960s until the early 1980s used this engine, which produces  at 4,000 rpm. It was first seen in a passenger car in June 1964, when it was fitted to the QGS31 Nissan Cedric.

SD22
First appearing in 1963 the SD22 is a naturally aspirated  inline-four diesel engine. It produces  at 4,000 rpm as fitted to the 1983 430-series Nissan Cedric. It was first used in a passenger car with the 330-series Nissan Cedric from June 1977. It was also produced in a marine version MN 22 by Chrysler Marine under license during the 1980s.

The SD22 was used in the Datsun 720 pickup trucks from 1980 through 1983, where it produced  (SAE) at 4,000 rpm. Like its lesser SD20 relative (but unlike its SD33 six-cylinder derivative) it has three main bearings and was never available with turbocharging. In 1981, pistons were upgraded to a three ring piston with a steel compression ring carrier cast as part of the piston for improved durability.

The engine is popular in Australia utilized mostly as a reliable pump for remote livestock stations. The engine may still be manufactured and imported by JESCO in California. JESCO also supplies parts. The marine version, using a water-cooled exhaust manifold and expansion tank is also still available from other manufacturers.

Applications:
 1963-1965 Nissan Caball QC141
 1964-1970 Nissan Junior Q40, Q41
 1965-1966 Nissan Caball QC142
 1966-1971 Nissan Cedric 130
 1966-1976 Nissan Caball C240 D4
 1970-1982 Nissan Junior 140-series
 1971-1975 Nissan Cedric 230
 1976-1979 Nissan Cedric 330-series 
 1980-1983 Datsun 720
 Nissan Caravan/Homy RE20-series

SD23
The SD23 is a  straight four diesel engine with eight valves (two per cylinder), and a distributor type injection pump. It produces  SAE net at 4,300 rpm and was fitted to the Nissan 720 and D21 Pickups, as well as the E23 Nissan Urvan and export market Y30-series Cedrics. The engine has also been used in many other functions, for forklifts, marine, and stationary applications. Unlike the smaller engines, the SD23 received a five bearing crankshaft. The European-spec version claimed , as fitted to the 1985 Urvan.

SD25
It was fitted to Nissan 720 pickup trucks 1983 through 1986 and D21 Nissan pickups (only 1986–1988). In Canada and some European markets it was also fitted to the Nissan Urvan and Cabstar. Featured five main bearing crankshaft and redesigned rear main seal.

Straight-six

SD33

The SD33 is a  straight-six diesel engine, most known for its use in the Nissan Patrol MQ (160 series) from 1980-1983 and the Nissan C80. The SD33 produces  at 3,800 rpm.

The Engine was also used in the UD 3400 series light truck, large forklifts, Marine applications, in International Scout offerings from 1976 to 1979, as well as the Jeep CJ-10/Cj-10A flightline tow vehicles from 1985 to 1986. The Scout-based Monteverdi Sahara was also offered with the SD33.

SD33T
The SD33T is a turbocharged  straight-six diesel engine that was used in 1980 for the powerplant in 6,400 International Harvester Scout II's. All were equipped with a T-19 manual transmission.

From July 1983 until 1987, SD33T engines were fitted to the Nissan Patrol MK (160 series - model 2).

See also
 List of Nissan engines

References

SD
Diesel engines by model
Straight-four engines
Straight-six engines